Yuna Aoki ( born 10 January 2002) is a Japanese competitive figure skater. She is the 2019 Bavarian Open silver medalist.

Personal life 
Aoki was born on January 10, 2002, in Yokohama, Japan.

Career

Early career 
Aoki started skating at age five after being inspired by Shizuka Arakawa's 2006 Olympic victory. She has been coached by Shoichiro Tsuzuki since the age of six.

In 2013–14, Aoki won the silver medal at the Japanese Novice Championships and placed 15th at the Japan Junior Championships that same year.

In 2014–15, Aoki won the Japan Novice Championships and placed 5th at the Japan Junior Championships. She was invited to skate in the gala at the 2015 World Team Trophy.

2015–16 season
During the 2015–16 season, Aoki debuted on the ISU Junior Grand Prix (JGP) circuit. She placed 7th at her JGP assignment in Riga, Latvia. In November, she finished 7th at the 2015–16 Japanese Junior Championships. The following month, she placed 16th in her senior national debut.

2018–19 season
Aoki finished 7th at her JGP assignment in Canada. She placed 5th at the Japan Junior Championships and 14th at the senior event. Making her senior international debut, she won silver at the Bavarian Open in February 2019.

Programs

Competitive highlights 
JGP: Junior Grand Prix

Detailed results

Senior Level

Junior Level

References

External links 
 

Japanese female single skaters
People from Yokohama
2002 births
Living people